Nogometni klub Renče, commonly referred to as NK Renče or simply Renče, was a Slovenian football club from Renče. The club competed in the Slovenian Second League under the name Goriške Opekarne. The club was founded in 1970 and played their home games at the Renče Sports Park. After the 2000–01 Slovenian Third League season, NK Renče was dissolved as they merged with NK Brda.

Honours
Slovenian Third League
 Winners: 1995–96, 2000–01

References

External links
Weltfussballarchiv profile

Association football clubs established in 1970
Association football clubs disestablished in 2001
Defunct football clubs in Slovenia
2001 disestablishments in Slovenia